Let There Be Light is a 1917 German silent drama film directed by Richard Oswald and starring Bernd Aldor, Hugo Flink and Nelly Lagarst. It was followed by three sequels. The film was a protest against Germany's anti-abortion law, and also touched on the dangers of syphilis. It is a lost film.

The film's sets were designed by the art director August Rinaldi. Manfred Noa was employed as an artistic consultant.

Cast
 Bernd Aldor as Georg Mauthner, Arzt
 Hugo Flink as Paul Maunther, Maler, Georgs Bruder
 Nelly Lagarst as Assistentin
 Ernst Ludwig as Stadtrat Kaufherr
Leontine Kühnberg as Else, dessen Tochter
 Lupu Pick as Dr. Franzius, annoncierender Arzt
 Max Gülstorff as Patient
 Kurt Vespermann as Gerd
 Kathe Oswald as Ingeborg
Conrad Veidt as Herr Kramer

References

Bibliography

External links

1917 films
Films of the German Empire
German silent feature films
Films directed by Richard Oswald
German drama films
1917 drama films
Films about syphilis
German black-and-white films
Silent drama films
1910s German films
1910s German-language films